Wild and Wooly is a 1978 comedy/Western television film directed by Philip Leacock and starring Charles Siebert, David Doyle, Elyssa Davalos, Vic Morrow, and Doug McClure. The screenplay concerns four turn-of-the-century women who break out of prison to foil an Irish assassin out to kill the President of the United States.

Cast
 Susan Bigelow as Liz Hannah
 Elyssa Davalos as Shilok
 Doug McClure as Delaney Banks
 David Doyle as President Theodore Roosevelt
 Ross Martin as Otis Bergen
 Vic Morrow as Warden Willis
 Paul Burke as Tobias Singleton
 Jessica Walter as Megan
 Charles Siebert as Sean
 Sherry Bain as Jessica
 Chris De Lisle as Lacey Langtry

External links
 
 

1978 films
Films directed by Philip Leacock
Films scored by Charles Bernstein
ABC network original films
American Western (genre) comedy films
1970s Western (genre) comedy films
1978 comedy films
1970s English-language films
1970s American films
American comedy television films
American Western (genre) television films